Bhutan participated at the 2018 Summer Youth Olympics in Buenos Aires, Argentina from 6 October to 18 October 2018.

Athletics

Bhutan qualified 1 athletes.

Judo

Bhutan qualified 1 athletes.

Team

Taekwondo

Bhutan qualified 1 athletes.

References

2018 in Bhutanese sport
Nations at the 2018 Summer Youth Olympics
Bhutan at the Youth Olympics